Double Alibi is a 1940 American crime film directed by Phil Rosen and written by Harold Buchman, Roy Chanslor and Charles Grayson. The film stars Wayne Morris, Margaret Lindsay, William Gargan, Roscoe Karns, Robert Emmett Keane and James Burke. The film was released on March 1, 1940, by Universal Pictures.

Plot
A man's ex-wife is murdered and he is the prime suspect.

Cast        
Wayne Morris as Stephen Wayne
Margaret Lindsay as Sue Casey
William Gargan as Walter Gifford
Roscoe Karns as Jeremiah Jenkins
Robert Emmett Keane as Chick Lester
James Burke as Police Captain Orr
William Pawley as Dan Kraley
Frank Mitchell as Lennie Noland
Eddy Chandler as Patrolman Harrigan
Cliff Clark as Police Inspector Early
Robert Emmett O'Connor as Patrolman Delaney
Wade Boteler as Bartender
Mary Treen as Hospital Switchboard Operator

References

External links
 

1940 films
American crime films
1940 crime films
Universal Pictures films
Films directed by Phil Rosen
American black-and-white films
1940s English-language films
1940s American films